Eleanor Darnall Carroll (1703-1796), was a wealthy heiress in colonial Maryland. She was the wife of Daniel Carroll, a politician and wealthy planter. Their son Daniel Carroll became one of the Founding Fathers of the United States; their son John Carroll became the Archbishop of Baltimore and founder of Georgetown University.

Early life
Eleanor Darnall was born into a wealthy planter family in about 1703, most likely at The Woodyard, the Darnall family home in Prince George’s County, Maryland. She was the daughter of Anne Digges (daughter of William Digges) and Henry Darnall II. The latter was a planter whose father Henry Darnall had held a number of governmental offices in the colonial administration of Maryland. As a child she was painted by the German painter Justus Engelhardt Kühn.

Eleanor was among the few women in colonial America to receive a formal education; she had been sent to a convent school in Flanders to finish her education. She inherited from her paternal grandfather, Henry Darnall, 27,000 acres in Prince George's County, where the family made their home in Upper Marlboro.

Family
Eleanor Darnall married Daniel Carroll, a wealthy merchant and planter. The couple had seven children:
 Henry Carroll, drowned in boyhood
 Daniel Carroll (1730 – 1796), who would become one of the Founding Fathers of the United States
 Ann Carroll Brent (1733-1804), mother of Robert Brent, first mayor of the city of Washington. 
 John Carroll (1735-1815), Archbishop of Baltimore and founder of Georgetown University
 Eleanor Carroll Brent (c. 1737-1810), married William Brent of Virginia
 Mary (1742-1815)
 Elizabeth (1745-1821)

Legacy

In around 1741 Eleanor Carroll and her husband sold some land to a merchant named James Wardrop. In 1742 Wardrop built the house known as Darnall's Chance which today houses the Darnall's Chance House Museum, an historic house museum which opened to the public in 1988.

Georgetown University's Darnall Hall is named in her honor.

Notes

References
Roarke, Elizabeth,Artists of Colonial America  Retrieved 16 August 2018 
Pomerenk, Kathleen Orr, Faith In Art: Justus Engelhardt Kuhn’s Portrait Of Eleanor Darnall, Georgetown University, Washington, D.C., April 15, 2009. Georgetown University Library, Digital Georgetown https://repository.library.georgetown.edu/handle/10822/553373 
Geiger, Sister M. Virgina, Daniel Carroll II, One Man and His Descendants, 1730-1798, College of Notre Dame of Maryland, 1979. 
Huffman, Ronald, Princes of Ireland, Planters of Maryland, A Carroll Saga, 1500-1782, Chapel Hill, North Carolina, University of North Carolina Press, 2000.

External links
Biography of Eleanor Darnall Retrieved 16 August 2018
 Eleanor Darnall at WikiTree
Gravestone of Eleanor Darnall Carroll Retrieved 22 August 2018

People of colonial Maryland
18th-century American women
1703 births
1796 deaths